Before the Portuguese discovery of Brazil, the region where the present state of Rondônia is situated was populated by indigenous peoples, who are known to have included the following:

:pt:Aruás (Aruá language);
Cinta Larga (language branch: Monde);
Gavião (language branch: Monde);
:pt:Jabutis (language branch: Jaboti);
Kanoê (language branch: Kanoê);
Karipuna, Amondauas (language branch: Tupi-Guarani);
Caritianas (language branch: Arikem);
Araras-caros (language branch: Ramarama);
Kaxarari (language branch: Pano);
Kwazá (language branch: Kwazá);
:pt:Macurap, :pt:Sakurabiat (language branch: Tupari);
Nambikwara (language branch: Nambikwara);
:pt:Oro-uins (language branch: Txapakura);
Paiter (language branch: Monde);
Tuparis (language branch: Tupari)

Colonial Period
The Spaniard Ñuflo de Chávez was the first European explorer to reach the valley of the Guaporé River between 1541 and 1542, although he only passed through. Bandeirantes arrived in the region around 1650, with the goal of exploiting the gold and other minerals of the territory. In the same period, Jesuit priests came to the region and founded the first village. 

As a consequence of the discovery of gold on the right bank of the Guaporé River, the Portuguese Crown founded the Captaincy of Mato Grosso in 1748 with :pt:Antonio Rolim de Moura Tavares as governor. On March 19, 1752, the governor designated Vila Bela da Santíssima Trindade as the capital, from where he commanded the border demarcation following the Treaty of Madrid (1750). In 1753, he installed a surveillance post in the village of Santa Rosa Velha, built by the Spanish on the right bank of the Guaporé, and thus in Brazilian lands. In 1759, the Spanish governor of Santa Cruz de la Sierra requested that the post be evacuated. Instead, Rolim de Moura built a fort to replace it, which became known as the Presídio de Nossa Senhora da Conceição. Due to the climate and the incursions of the Spanish, the Presidio was soon in ruins. It was rebuilt in 1769 by Governor Luís Pinto de Sousa Coutinho, and renamed as :pt:Forte de Bragança. Ruined again, in 1776 the Forte Príncipe da Beira was built in its place. In 1772, Francisco de Melo Palheta led an expedition from Belém which reached the Madeira River, the Mamoré River and the Guaporé River, reaching Santa Cruz de la Sierra. The decline of mining and the proclamation of the First Brazilian Republic caused the region to lose its economic importance until the end of the nineteenth century, when the exploitation of rubber entered its peak.

Postcolonial history
In April 1878, following to the Treaty of Ayacucho, the border between Bolivia and Brazil was mapped by cartographic teams and agreed in 1879. The Treaty of Petrópolis in 1903 led to the construction of the Madeira-Mamoré Railroad, leading to increased settlement.

Decree-Law No. 5812 (13 of September 1943) established the Federal Territory of Guaporé was created from parts of the states of Amazonas and Mato Grosso. By the law of February 17 1956, the region became known as the Federal Territory of Rondônia, in honor of Marshal Cândido Rondon. The exploitation of brazil nuts and rubber was the main economic activity until the discovery of cassiterite deposits, which accelerated the development and settlement of the region. This development led to the territory achieving the status of a state in 1982, with 13 constituent municipalities, including the capital, Porto Velho. These are: Guajará-Mirim, Ji-Paraná, Vilhena, Ariquemes, Jaru, Pimenta Bueno, Colorado do Oeste, Cacoal, Ouro Preto do Oeste, Presidente Médici, Espigão d'Oeste and Costa Marques.

References

History of Brazil by state
Bolivia–Brazil border
Rondônia